Hypostomus johnii is a species of catfish in the family Loricariidae. It is native to South America, where it occurs in the basins of the Parnaíba River and the São Francisco River. The species reaches 11.3 cm (4.4 inches) SL and is believed to be a facultative air-breather.

References

External links 
Original description at Biodiversity Heritage Library

johnii
Fish of the São Francisco River basin
Fish described in 1877
Taxa named by Franz Steindachner